Hypercompe castronis is a moth of the family Erebidae first described by Embrik Strand in 1919. It is found in Brazil.

References

castronis
Moths described in 1919